Randy Randall Rudy Quaid (born October 1, 1950) is an American actor known for his roles in both serious drama and light comedy.

He was nominated for an Academy Award, BAFTA Award and a Golden Globe Award for his role in The Last Detail in 1973. In 1978 he co-starred as a prisoner in Midnight Express. Quaid also won a Golden Globe and was nominated for an Emmy Award for his portrayal of U.S. President Lyndon Johnson in LBJ: The Early Years (1987).

He also received Emmy nominations for his roles in A Streetcar Named Desire (1984) and Elvis (2005). Quaid is also known for his roles of Cousin Eddie in the National Lampoon's Vacation movies and Russell Casse in Independence Day (1996). He voiced Alameda Slim in the animated feature Home on the Range (2004).

Early years and education
Quaid was born in Houston, Texas, to Juanita Bonniedale "Nita" (née Jordan), a real estate agent, and William Rudy Quaid (November 21, 1923 – February 8, 1987), an electrician. Quaid has English, Scots-Irish, and Cajun ancestry. Through his father, Quaid is a first cousin, twice removed, of cowboy performer Gene Autry. Randy Quaid grew up in Bellaire, Texas, a small city surrounded by Houston, and in southwest Houston.  He is the older brother of actor Dennis Quaid.

In high school, he took a class in drama on a whim, although he didn't expect he would enjoy the lectures. After the third day, however, he was captivated by the course and decided to make acting his professional goal. He continued studying acting at the University of Houston. During one course, his teacher sent him to audition for Peter Bogdanovich, who was casting for The Last Picture Show, and Quaid won the role in what became his debut film.

Acting career

Film
Randy Quaid has appeared in over 90 films. Peter Bogdanovich discovered him when Quaid was a student at the University of Houston, and he received his first exposure in Bogdanovich's The Last Picture Show. His character escorts Jacy Farrow (Cybill Shepherd) to a late-night indoor skinny-dip at a swimming pool. Other Bogdanovich films he appeared in are What's Up, Doc? and Paper Moon.

Quaid's first major critically acclaimed role was in The Last Detail (1973). He played Larry Meadows, a young United States Navy sailor on his way to serve a harsh sentence for petty theft. Jack Nicholson starred as a sailor assigned to transport him to prison. Quaid was nominated for an Academy Award for Best Supporting Actor, Golden Globe Award for Best Supporting Actor – Motion Picture, and a BAFTA Award for Best Actor in a Supporting Role. In 1976, he appeared opposite Marlon Brando in The Missouri Breaks. In 1978 Quaid had a supporting role in the Alan Parker drama Midnight Express, about Americans and an Englishman imprisoned in Turkey.

Quaid appeared opposite Charles Bronson in the 1975 action film of a Mexican prison escape Breakout, based on actual events. Quaid was also the lead in the comedy Martians Go Home and Cold Dog Soup and played the King of Spain in Goya's Ghosts.

In 1987, he won a Golden Globe Award and was nominated for an Emmy for his portrayal of President Lyndon Johnson in LBJ: The Early Years. Quaid said that he had wanted to play Johnson since becoming an actor. "I responded to him and his wants and needs in a way I've never done with any other character," he said. Quaid also tried to portray what he learned were Johnson's political attitude:

In 1992, he played the monster in Frankenstein, opposite Patrick Bergin as Victor Frankenstein. Quaid said "I wanted to make the monster not just a monster, but a disfigured man. I wanted to emphasize the human qualities. He is basically struggling for equal rights. He wants anything any man would want." Quaid had starring roles in the 1996 film Kingpin, where he played the Amish bowler Ishmael, as well as a role as pilot in the blockbuster science fiction film Independence Day, released the same year. He previously starred in Quick Change with Bill Murray in 1990.  Quaid also appeared in four of the seven films in the National Lampoon's Vacation film series as Cousin Eddie, jovial redneck relative (through marriage) to Beverly D'Angelo, wife of Chevy Chase's Clark Griswold.

Shortly after appearing in National Lampoon's Christmas Vacation, the third installment of the series, Quaid was featured in Days of Thunder (1990) as NASCAR car owner and successful car salesman Tim Daland, a determined businessman who expects his team to be top-notch for fans and sponsors. Quaid was given the lead role in a Vacation spin-off, a made-for-television film National Lampoon's Christmas Vacation 2: Cousin Eddie's Island Adventure (2003), which marks his final appearance in the franchise to date. He had a pivotal supporting role in Brokeback Mountain (2005) as rancher Joe Aguirre. Quaid had a co-starring role in the Canadian independent comedy Real Time (2008), which opened the 2008 Slamdance Film Festival. His acclaimed performance earned him a Vancouver Film Critics Circle Award.

Following his work in the direct-to-video comedy Balls Out: Gary the Tennis Coach (2009), Quaid's legal troubles prevented him from working for almost a decade.
Quaid was not asked to reprise the role of Cousin Eddie in Vacation (2015), although the character is verbally referenced. He returned to performing with Rob Margolies' weight loss comedy All You Can Eat (2018), which premiered at the SOHO International Film Festival in June 2018. After the film's September 2018 screening at the Northeast Film Festival, Quaid was nominated for their award for "Best Supporting Actor in a Feature Film".

Television
In 1981, Quaid co-starred in the two part television film adaptation of John Steinbeck's novel Of Mice and Men, playing the character of Lenny. Quaid's other television appearances include a season as a Saturday Night Live (SNL) cast member (1985–1986), the role of gunslinger John Wesley Hardin in the miniseries Streets of Laredo and starring roles in the short-lived series The Brotherhood of Poland, New Hampshire (2003) and Davis Rules (1991–1992).

In 2005, he received Golden Globe Award and Emmy Award nominations for his portrayal of Elvis Presley's manager, Colonel Tom Parker, in the critically acclaimed CBS television network miniseries Elvis.

He was featured in the highly rated television films Category 6: Day of Destruction (2004) and Category 7: The End of the World (2005) and starred in Last Rites, a made-for-cable Starz/Encore! premiere movie. Quaid voiced the character Colonel Sanders in radio and television commercials for fast-food restaurant chain Kentucky Fried Chicken. Quaid's voice-over work also included Capitol One Credit Card, US Air, Miller Beer and a guest role in The Ren and Stimpy Show (as Anthony's father in the second-season episode, "A Visit to Anthony"). He narrated the 2006 PBS series Texas Ranch House.

Theater
In 2004, Quaid appeared on stage undertaking the starring role of Frank in the world premiere of Sam Shepard's The God of Hell, produced by the New School University at the Actors Studio Drama School in New York. In The God of Hell, Quaid's portrayal of Frank, a Wisconsin dairy farmer whose home is infiltrated by a dangerous government operative who wants to take over his farm, was well-received and -reviewed by New York City's top theatre critics. It marked the second time that Quaid starred in a Shepard play, the first being the long running Broadway hit True West.

In February 2008, a five-member hearing committee of Actors' Equity Association, the labor union representing American stage actors, banned Quaid for life and fined him more than $81,000. The charges that brought the sanctions originated in a Seattle production of Lone Star Love, a Western-themed adaptation of William Shakespeare's The Merry Wives of Windsor, in which Quaid played the lead role of Falstaff. The musical was scheduled to come to Broadway, but producers cancelled it.

According to the New York Post, all 26 members of the musical cast brought charges that Quaid "physically and verbally abused his fellow performers" and that the show closed rather than continuing to Broadway because of Quaid's "oddball behavior". Quaid's lawyer, Mark Block, said the charges were false, and that one of the complaining actors had said the action was driven by "the producers who did not want to give Randy his contractual rights to creative approval ... or financial participation ..." Block said that Quaid had left the union before the musical started, making the ban moot, and that Quaid only participated in the hearing because he wanted due process. Quaid's statement on the charges was "I am guilty of only one thing: giving a performance that elicited a response so deeply felt by the actors and producers with little experience of my creative process that they actually think I am Falstaff."

Music career
Quaid has performed musical work, primarily through his band Randy Quaid & The Fugitives. The group released its first single, "Star Whackers", in March 2011. An accompanying film, Star Whackers, was premiered by the Quaids in Vancouver on April 23, 2011.

Personal life

Relationships
Quaid was married to Ella Marie Jolly, a former model, on May 11, 1980, and they had a daughter, Amanda Marie, born May 29, 1983. They were separated on September 9, 1986, and divorced on August 24, 1989. He said of their split, "I went through this delayed adolescent thing. I didn't want to be tied down to a family."

Quaid met Evi Motolanez in December 1987 on the set of the film Bloodhounds of Broadway,  in which Madonna starred. They wed on October 5, 1989, at the San Ysidro Ranch, a Montecito, California, resort. His brother Dennis, his future sister-in-law Meg Ryan, and his six-year-old daughter Amanda were in attendance.

Political views
After 2016, Quaid became an outspoken supporter of Donald Trump and believed the outcome of the 2020 United States presidential election was the result of widespread election fraud. Three weeks after the election, Trump, on his Twitter account, thanked Quaid for agreeing with his claim.

Legal issues
In 2006, Quaid, who acted in Brokeback Mountain, sued the producers for misrepresenting the film as "a low-budget, art house film with no prospect of making money" in order to secure Quaid's professional acting services at below-market rates.

In 2009, Quaid and his wife were arrested for allegedly defrauding an innkeeper in Santa Barbara by using an invalid credit card to pay a $10,000 bill. The two were released on bail that evening and subsequently paid most of the bill. However, they repeatedly failed to appear in court and warrants were issued for their arrest. They eventually appeared in court the following year where the case was dismissed against Quaid for lack of evidence. His wife, Evi, pleaded no contest to a misdemeanor count of fraud and was placed on probation for three years in addition to having to spend 240 hours in community service.

In September 2010, Quaid and his wife were charged with burglary after they spent five days occupying the guest house in a vacant home they once owned in Santa Barbara. The Quaids claimed that the home was wrongfully transferred to a third party by the use of a forged signature. Warrants for their arrest were issued after they failed to appear in court, and as a result, they also forfeited their bail.

In October 2010, Quaid and his wife moved to Vancouver, Canada, where they sought asylum protections under the Canadian Immigration and Refugee Protection Act, stating that they feared for their lives in the United States. Border authorities arrested the couple for their outstanding warrants in the U.S. After they were granted bail, Quaid gave a press interview, and later, the couple's asylum-seeking story was detailed in an article by Vanity Fair. Quaid's wife Evi was granted Canadian citizenship in 2011, based on her parentage, and Quaid sought permanent resident status as the husband of a Canadian. In January 2013, this request was denied.

Quaid lived in Montreal beginning in 2013 and was briefly arrested for not checking in as a non-resident. In 2014, the Quaids sued the U.S. State Department for revoking their passports in 2011. By 2015, Quaid's legal appeals in Canada were exhausted, and he was notified he was to be deported. One week prior to the deportation date, the couple drove across the Canadian border into Vermont, where they were detained by U.S. Customs. The couple were detained pending an extradition procedure ordered by the State of California.

On review of the State of California's case, the Vermont judge found irregularities, and voided the extradition request, whereupon the Quaids were released and allowed to remain in Vermont without conditions. With his lawyer at his side, Quaid asserted in a press conference that the reason he was released was that the California judge had issued an arrest warrant before the alleged crime had been committed. In principle, the Quaids were subject to arrest should he travel to another state, yet in 2017, they vacationed in California without incident. Quaid and his wife planned to make Vermont their permanent home, as his wife grew up there.

Filmography

References

External links

 
 
 
 January 2011 Vanity Fair profile

1950 births
Bellaire High School (Bellaire, Texas) alumni
Male actors from Houston
American male film actors
American male television actors
American male voice actors
American people of English descent
American people of French descent
American people of Irish descent
American prisoners and detainees
Applicants for refugee status in Canada
Best Miniseries or Television Movie Actor Golden Globe winners
Cajun people
American emigrants to Canada
Living people
University of Houston alumni
20th-century American male actors
21st-century American male actors
American sketch comedians
Comedians from Texas
People from Bellaire, Texas